Pleidelsheim is a municipality in the state of Baden-Württemberg, about  north of Stuttgart. Pleidelsheim is situated on the right bank of the Neckar river across from Ingersheim. This historical town has buildings that date back to the 14th century.

Personality

Sons and daughters of the town

 Johann David Wildermuth, (1807-1885, professor and high school teacher in Tübingen, husband of Ottilie Wildermuth
 Adelbert von Keller, (1812-1883), German scholar and linguist

Other personalities
 1983 Arthur Boka, professional footballer of VfB Stuttgart, lived in Pleidelsheim.

References

External links
Official website

Ludwigsburg (district)
Populated places on the Neckar basin
Populated riverside places in Germany